Antiochia ad Pyramum was an ancient coastal city of Cilicia, on the Pyramus (also Pyramos, now the Ceyhan Nehri) river, in Anatolia. It was the successor settlement to Magarsa. The location of the city is on the Karataş Peninsula, Adana Province, Turkey, a few km from the city of Karataş. The course of the Pyramus has changed markedly since ancient times and the location of the ruins is no longer adjacent to the river, but decidedly west of its present course. The formerly important ancient site of Mallus lies a few km inland from Antiochia ad Pyranum along the former course of the Pyramus.

References

 Blue Guide, Turkey, The Aegean and Mediterranean Coasts, p. 563

Archaeological sites in the Mediterranean Region, Turkey
Seleucid colonies in Anatolia
Roman sites in Turkey
Ruins in Turkey
Former populated places in Cilicia
Geography of Adana Province
History of Adana Province
Populated places in ancient Cilicia